This is a complete list of the operas of the Italian composer Niccolò Piccinni (1728–1800).

List

References
 Libby, Dennis et al. (1992), "Piccinni, Niccolò" in The New Grove Dictionary of Opera, ed. Stanley Sadie (London) 
 Some of the information in this article is taken from the related Dutch Wikipedia article.

External links

 
Lists of operas by composer